Colmworth is a village and civil parish in the Borough of Bedford in the county of Bedfordshire, England about  north-east of Bedford.

The parish, including the hamlet of Duck's Cross, had a population of 393 at the 2011 census.

Geography

The village is separated by Colmworth Brook into two areas. To the north is the larger Church End and to the south is Chapel End.

Area

Elevation

Landscape

The village lies within the Bedfordshire and Cambridgeshire Claylands as designated by Natural England. Bedford Borough Council classifies the local landscape  as Thurleigh Clay Farmland with large and open arable fields. Roads are mainly lined with hedges and trees interspersed with open stretches.

Geology and soil type

The parish lies on Oadby till above Oxford clay and Kellaways beds.

The soil is highly fertile, lime-rich, loamy and clayey with impeded drainage.

The night sky and light pollution

Light pollution is the level of radiance (night lights) shining up into the night sky. The Campaign to Protect Rural England (CPRE) divides the level of night sky brightness into 9 bands with band 1 being the darkest i.e. with the lowest level of light pollution and band 9 the brightest and most polluted. Colmworth is in bands 2 and 3 

Roads and footpaths

The main road through the village goes north to Little Staughton and Pertenhall and south to Great Barford.

There is an extensive network of public footpaths in the south and west of the parish. A path runs south from Honeydon Road, Church End and reaches Wilden. Another runs west off Little Staughton Road to Bolnhurst.

History
Evidence of Middle and Late Iron Age settlement discovered by archaeologists at Colley Hill Farm in 2011 was considered to be "locally and regionally significant".

A medieval moated enclosure, fishponds and fowling earthworks are at Manor Farm.

The Colmworth Enclosure Act was passed in 1834.

A Primitive Methodist Chapel opened in 1866.

The village hall was built in 1969. In 1995, a new apex roof replaced the flat one and a substantial refurbishment was carried out.

Colmworth Golf Course opened in 1991.

Colmworth CofE VC Lower School closed in August 2003 and the buildings, built circa 1968, used as a nursery.

The Colmworth Chronicle newsletter shows that the Post Office closed in 2009.

Governance
The parish council consists of 7 elected councillors who serve a four-year term. Colmworth is in Wyboston ward for elections to the Borough of Bedford Unitary Authority.

Prior to 1894, Colmworth was administered as part of the hundred of Barford.
From 1894 until 1974 it was in Bedford Rural District and from 1974 to 2009 in Bedford Borough.

Colmworth was in the Bedford parliamentary constituency until 1983 and North Bedfordshire until 1997. It is now part of the North East Bedfordshire constituency.

Church
St Denys church was built between 1426 and 1430 by Sir Gerard Braybrook.  It is dedicated to the patron saint of France in honour of his French wife, Eleanor.

The church is part of the Wilden with Colmworth and Ravensden benefice in the Sharnbrook Deanery of the Diocese of St Albans.

Community facilities and events
The village hall, owned and managed by a charitable trust, can seat up to 120 and has a wooden dance floor. At the rear of the hall is a playing field with children's play area owned and maintained by the parish council.

A mobile Post Office serves the village Wednesday and Friday lunchtimes, and a mobile library fortnightly on
Friday mornings.

A small  country park has been established on land bought by the parish council near to Manor Farm. There is a wildflower meadow, orchard, pond, bird hide and owl boxes. Colmworth Triangle Garden is a community garden established in 2013 adjacent to the Manor Barns and St Deny's Church.

Colmworth and North Bedfordshire is an 18-hole, par 72 golf course with a par 3 pitch and putt and 8 bay floodlit driving range.

The Colmworth Chronicle is a quarterly newsletter, first published in December 1986. Delivered to residents in printed form and online, there are updates from Parish Council meetings, St Deny's Church, Colmworth and Neighbours History Society, the Gardening Club and Book Group.

The grade II listed Cornfields Restaurant & Hotel dates back to the 17th century and was formerly The Wheatsheaf public house.

Since 2016, the Friends of St Denys' Church have held  Cars and Bikes with Character rallies at Colmworth Village Hall, the first Sunday of the month from April to October to raise funds for church repairs.

Public transport
Grant Palmer runs a two hourly bus service, Monday to Saturday, morning and early afternoon to Bedford plus one Thursday only return journey to St Neots.

The nearest railway station is St Neots.

Businesses
Acorn Transport and Plant Hire, based at Duck's Cross was established in 1998 and move bulk materials. Acorn also does groundworks and is a registered waste carrier and processor; supplying recycled aggregates, topsoil, sands, stones and road plantings.

References

External links 

Colmworth pages at the Bedfordshire and Luton Archives and Records Service

Villages in Bedfordshire
Civil parishes in Bedfordshire
Borough of Bedford